Jacob Ford House is a historic home located at Morristown in St. Lawrence County, New York.  It is a -story rectangular stone structure with a gable roof, built in 1837 in a late Federal style. There is a -story wing on the south side.  The front features a portico added about 1890.

It was listed on the National Register of Historic Places in 1982.

References

Houses on the National Register of Historic Places in New York (state)
Federal architecture in New York (state)
Houses completed in 1837
Houses in St. Lawrence County, New York
National Register of Historic Places in St. Lawrence County, New York